The 2016–17 New York Riveters season is the second in franchise history.

Offseason
On August 1, 2016, it was announced that the Riveters relocated to the Barnabas Health Hockey House in Newark, New Jersey, situated within the Prudential Center. The facility was the site of the first-ever Isobel Cup Finals.

Trades

Signings

Draft

The following were the Riveters selections in the 2016 NWHL Draft on June 18, 2016.

Awards and honors
Amanda Kessel, NWHL All-Star Game MVP
Janine Weber, NWHL Player of the Week (Awarded February 22, 2017)

References

2016–17 NWHL season by team
New York Riveters
New York Riveters
New York Riveters